Gaillardiellus is a genus of crabs in the family Xanthidae, containing the following species:

 Gaillardiellus alphonsi (Nobili, 1905)
 Gaillardiellus bathus Davie, 1997
 Gaillardiellus orientalis (Odhner, 1925)
 Gaillardiellus rueppelli (Krauss, 1843)
 Gaillardiellus superciliaris (Odhner, 1925)

References

Xanthoidea